Federation of European Scouting or Fédération du Scoutisme Européen may refer to:
 International Union of Guides and Scouts of Europe (Union Internationale des Guides et Scouts d'Europe – Fédération du Scoutisme Européen, UIGSE-FSE)
 several member organizations of the Confédération Européenne de Scoutisme; among them
 European Scout Federation (British Association) (FSE).